Dr Challoner's Grammar School (also known as DCGS, Challoner's Boys or simply Challoner's) is a selective grammar school for boys, with a co-educational Sixth Form, in Amersham, Buckinghamshire, England. It was given academy status in January 2011.

It was founded in 1624 in accordance with the last will and testament of Robert Chaloner. Chaloner, a Doctor of Divinity, was Rector of Amersham from 1576 to his death in 1621. He was also a Canon of St George’s Chapel, Windsor from 1584.

History
In his will, Robert Chaloner left money to establish a grammar school in Amersham.
 "… the like sume of twenty pounds yearly out of the said lands at Wavendon I give unto my wellbeloved friend Mr. William Tothill Esquire and Mr William Pennyman Esquire to erect a free gramar schoole in Amersam in the County of Bucks to be established by Deede of Feofment or otherwise as their wisdome can devise  The towne and pish allotinge the Churche house for the schoole house or my successor a tenemt in the occupation of Enoch Wyar now or of late for the dwellinge house of the schoole maister whome I will to be chosen by my exequitrix my successor and Mr. Tothill afterwards by my successor and sixe of the eldest Feoffees and cheefest  This I leave as a testimony of my loce to them and theire children. Orders for the school—I desire my successor to pcure from the best ordered schooles"

The school was situated in Old Amersham for almost three centuries before moving, with the support of Buckinghamshire County Council, to its present position in Amersham-on-the Hill in 1905. At this time, the school embraced the principle of co-education for the first time which, according to the school’s first prospectus in 1906, was "practically universal in America". Each year the boys at Challoner's celebrate Founder's Day where they attend St Mary's Church in Old Amersham where Robert Chaloner was rector.

By 1937, Challoner's was incorporated into the state system of education and by the early 1950s, the school had about 350 boys and girls on roll. However, plans for expansion to 550 pupils were overtaken by rapid population growth in the area and the decision was made to establish a separate school for girls in Little Chalfont: Dr. Challoner's High School, which opened in 1962. The two schools continue to maintain relatively close links, collaborating especially in music and drama productions, whilst Dr Challoner's Debating Society has staged numerous collaborative events. Girls were admitted to the boys’ school sixth form in 2016

The continued expansion of the grammar school to its present size of over 1,350 students saw major building projects in the 1950s, 1980s, and 1990s, followed by the construction of a large astroturf pitch and improvements to the sports fields. Another floor has been added on top of the old library and the new library was reopened in early 2013.

In 2002, Challoner's became one of the first Science Colleges in the United Kingdom. The school started a second special focus as a Language College in April 2007. In 2005, the school celebrated the 100th anniversary of the move to the current site on Chesham Road, also building the Centenary Sports Pitch. The school was commended by the 2007 Ofsted inspection team and rated outstanding in all 51 criteria.
On 1 September 2008, the school officially changed its status from a Voluntary Controlled school to a Foundation school, on the basis that "the additional autonomy which foundation status offers will enabled the school to provide an even better standard of education in the future". In January 2011 the school became an Academy.

Extracurricular

Robotics
Since the school founded its robotics team in 2015, Challoner's has competed in national and international competitions. In 2017, the school competed in the Student Robotics competition led by University of Southampton and won two awards. In 2018, a team entered into PiWars, a competition involving Raspberry Pi computers hosted at the University of Cambridge. The competition consisted of autonomous and remote controlled challenges with tasks requiring computer vision. The team came out winning the whole competition and having podium finishes on the majority of the challenges.

Model United Nations
The school has had large amounts of success with its Model United Nations society. Almost entirely student-led, teams have traveled to attend multiple international conferences including HABSMUN and LIMUN. The teams have been successful: at LIMUN 2017 over half of the 16 Year 12 students attending won awards and the Challoner's team won the conference overall. In March 2018 the society competed at SPIMUN (St Petersburg International Model United Nations) where five students won awards. In 2017, the society won the 'We Made a Difference Award' in the 2017 Speaker's Schools Council Awards.

In January 2018, the school hosted its first conference, Challoner's MUN. With over 130 students from 11 schools, the conference was one of the largest student-led activities to have ever been undertaken, having been organized by an executive team of 13 students.

Houses
The house system was re-established in 2004. An earlier house system with four houses named for those listed in the original school song as "Buckinghamshire's four mighty men"—Challoner , Hampden , Milton  and Penn —was abandoned in 1976. The chorus of that song appears below.

England of shires has a good two score
Each of them brags of her mighty men
Bucks she can boast of her famous four
Challoner, Hampden, Milton and Penn

There are currently six houses, each named after a previous headmaster:

The houses compete in a yearly competition, starting when students begin school in September and culminating at Sports Day, usually in late June. The competition is keenly contested, and every student is given an opportunity to take part in over 70 competitions. The range of activities include sports, drama and music to code-breaking. It also offers a leadership opportunity for students in positions such as Captains, Deputy Captains, and mentors.

Academics
Dr Challoner's students did well in two subjects nationally in 2003. It was one of two schools named by the Department of Education (the other being Royal Grammar School, High Wycombe) as the best performing schools nationwide in the 2003 GCSEs and named the country's best grammar school in 2011. In the 2011 GCSEs, boys achieved a 100% pass rate with 50 of the 183 candidates earning all A*-A grades.

Notable former pupils

Notable former students include:
 Chris Cleave – novelist
 Dame Sandra Dawson – Master of Sidney Sussex College, Cambridge University
Dominic Goodman – cricketer for Gloucestershire
 Roger Hammond – professional cyclist
 Greg Hands – Conservative MP for Chelsea & Fulham and Minister of State for Trade Policy
 Elizabeth Laverick – engineer
 Margaret Mee – botanical artist
 Roger Moore – actor
 John Mousinho – footballer
 Andrew Orr-Ewing – professor of physical chemistry at Bristol University
 Kenneth Page Oakley – anthropologist
 Dominic Raab – Conservative MP for Esher & Walton, Lord Chancellor, Deputy Prime Minister and former Foreign Secretary
 Matt Watson – cricketer
 Sam Westaway – cricketer

Headteachers
 Edward Rayner 1624–1640 
 ? Angell 1640–1650 
 Humphrey Gardiner 1650–1676 
 John Hughes 1676–1697 
 ? Crowfoot 1697–1702 (Dudley Penard officiated – 1698)
 Benjamin Robertshaw 1702–1706 
 not known 1706–1790 
 Richard Thorne 1790–1822 
 Henry Foyster 1822–1826 
 Matthew Stalker 1826–1849 
 W. S. Newman 1849–1850 
 Edmund J Luce 1850–1862 
 W. H. Williams 1862–1880 
 Frederick Weller 1881–1883
 W. J. Foxell 1883–1886 
 Colin J. Creed 1886–1888 
 Lewis H. Pearson 1888–1889
 E. P. Cooper 1889–1897 
 E. H. Wainwright 1897–1908 
 R. E. Yates 1908–1935 
 J. E. Simpson 1935–1937 
 T. P. Oakley (acting) 1937–1938 
 Neville Harrow 1938–1956 
 R. Simm (acting) 1941–1945 
 W. C. Porter 1956–1964
 D Holman 1965–1972 
 J. A. Loarridge 1972–1992 
 G. C. Hill 1993–2001 
 Mark A. Fenton 2001–16
 David Atkinson 2016–

See also
 List of English and Welsh endowed schools (19th century)

References

Further reading

External links
Department for Education Performance Tables 2011

Amersham
Grammar schools in Buckinghamshire
Academies in Buckinghamshire
1624 establishments in England
Educational institutions established in the 1620s
Boys' schools in Buckinghamshire